The Shrewsbury Flower Show is an annual event held in mid-August over two days (in recent times the second Friday and Saturday of the month) at The Quarry, the main park in the town of Shrewsbury, the county town of Shropshire, England. The show is organised by the Shropshire Horticultural Society. It was featured in the 2005 Guinness Book of Records as the "longest-running flower show" in the world.

Post World War II
The show, not held during the Second World War, was revived in 1946, with the organising support of Percy Thrower who was Shrewsbury's Parks Superintendent from that year until 1975, and acted as horticultural advisor and eventually chairman of the Shropshire Horticultural Society. After the show made severe losses due to bad weather in 1970, Thrower and Doug Whittingham both stood as financial guarantors to enable the show, which made a profit in better conditions in 1971, to continue staging.

Show features
The show is set out under a large number of marquees over the  land area of The Quarry and notable features include: the display of flowers, fruit and vegetables; the sale of arts and crafts and three military bands, show jumping, various forms of music and entertainment, which includes a large firework display on both evenings. The show typically attracts around 60,000 visitors over two days.
 
Chef celebrities, such as James Martin and 'The Hairy Bikers', annually practice demonstrations to the public.

References

External links

 Official Shrewsbury Flower Show website

Tourist attractions in Shropshire
Shrewsbury
Flower shows
Gardening in England
August events
Events in Shropshire